Tony Falelavaki (born 21 November 1985) is a Paralympian athlete from France competing mainly in F44 classification throwing events.

Athletics history
Falelavaki first represented France at the 2008 Summer Paralympics in Beijing, entering the shot put and javelin throw events (F44). In the shot he finished eighth, and in the javelin eleventh. Four years later he took part in the 2012 Paralympics in London, this time with his focus solely on the javelin. His third round throw of 58.21 set a new European record and gave Falelavaki the silver medal.

As well as his Paralympic success Falelavki has also qualified for three IPC Athletics World Championships. His most successful World Championship was in 2013 in Lyon where he won gold in the men's javelin F44. He was also selected to light the cauldron to start the 2013 Pacific Mini Games, set in his home island of Wallis and Futuna.

Personal history
Falelavaki was born on the South Pacific island of Wallis and Futuna in 1985. He was born with congenital talipes equinovarus.

Notes

Paralympic athletes of France
Athletes (track and field) at the 2008 Summer Paralympics
Athletes (track and field) at the 2012 Summer Paralympics
Paralympic silver medalists for France
Living people
Medalists at the 2012 Summer Paralympics
French male discus throwers
French male javelin throwers
French male shot putters
Wallis and Futuna athletes
1985 births
Paralympic medalists in athletics (track and field)
20th-century French people
21st-century French people